Kumho Asiana Main Tower (금호아시아나 본관) is the headquarters of the Kumho Asiana Group, a South Korean conglomerate.

The head office of Air Seoul is in the building.

Architecture
Unlike the adjacent apartment and office buildings, the Kumho Asiana Main tower is curved. The designers said 
they were inspired by the image of an airplane in flight. 
 
Kumho Asiana is the parent company of Asiana Airlines.  The glass 
and steel façade also sports a digital media board. The art façade is illuminated by 42,000 LED light bulbs to display different designs or works of art by commissioned artists.

See also
Kumho Asiana Group
LED
New media art
Light pollution

References 

Buildings and structures in Seoul
Kumho Asiana Group
Office buildings completed in 2008